Secusio mania is a moth of the subfamily Arctiinae first described by Herbert Druce in 1887. It is found in Malawi, Mozambique and Uganda.

References

Arctiinae
Lepidoptera of Uganda
Lepidoptera of Mozambique
Lepidoptera of Malawi
Moths of Sub-Saharan Africa
Moths described in 1887